Los Molinos is a Chilean village and harbour in the commune of Valdivia in Valdivia Province, Los Ríos Region. It is located just north of Niebla and a few kilometers south of Curiñanco.

See also
 List of towns in Chile

References

Beaches of Chile
Populated places in Valdivia Province
Landforms of Los Ríos Region
Populated coastal places in Chile